Hibbertia spicata is a species of flowering plant in the family Dilleniaceae and is endemic to the west of Western Australia. It is a low, erect to spreading shrub with scattered linear leaves with the edges rolled under and yellow flowers with six or seven stamens on one side of two softly-hairy carpels, and a larger number of staminodes.

Description
The flowers are crowded along a cincinnus of eight to fourteen flowers, all but the lowest with two bracts at the base. There are six or seven stamens fused at the base on one side of the two softly-hairy carpels, and ten to fourteen staminodes arranged around the carpels, each carpel with two ovules. Flowering occurs from April to October.

Taxonomy
Hibbertia spicata was first formally described in 1860 by Ferdinand von Mueller in Fragmenta Phytographiae Australiae from specimens collected at Port Gregory by Pemberton Walcott and Augustus Frederick Oldfield. The specific epithet (spicata) means "spicate".

In 1984, Judith Roderick Wheeler described two subspecies and the names are accepted by the Australian Plant Census:
 Hibbertia spicata subsp. leptotheca K.R.Thiele has few, or no staminodes, and the outer two sepals more or less glabrous;
 Hibbertia spicata F.Muell. subsp. spicata has six to twelve staminodes and the outer two sepals are hairy.

Distribution and habitat
Subspecies leptotheca grows on near-coastal limestone between Lancelin and the Yalgorup National Park and subspecies spicata grows in a variety of soils in heathland on the Darling Range.

See also
List of Hibbertia species

References

spicata
Eudicots of Western Australia
Plants described in 1904
Taxa named by Ferdinand von Mueller